Ensign is a city in Gray County, Kansas, United States.  As of the 2020 census, the population of the city was 166.

History
Ensign was originally called Lone Lake, and under the latter name laid out about 1886. It was renamed Ensign in 1888 in honor of its founder, G. L. Ensign.

Geography
Ensign is located at  (37.652608, -100.232657).

Demographics

2010 census
As of the census of 2010, there were 187 people, 76 households, and 52 families living in the city. The racial makeup of the city was 88.2% White, 1.6% African American, 1.6% Native American, 5.9% from other races, and 2.7% from two or more races. Hispanic or Latino of any race were 28.3% of the population.

There were 76 households, of which 27.6% had children under the age of 18 living with them, 56.6% were married couples living together, 7.9% had a female householder with no husband present, 3.9% had a male householder with no wife present, and 31.6% were non-families. 27.6% of all households were made up of individuals, and 14.5% had someone living alone who was 65 years of age or older. The average household size was 2.46 and the average family size was 3.02.

The median age in the city was 41.5 years. 24.1% of residents were under the age of 18; 8% were between the ages of 18 and 24; 21.9% were from 25 to 44; 32.6% were from 45 to 64; and 13.4% were 65 years of age or older. The gender makeup of the city was 48.1% male and 51.9% female.

2000 census
As of the census of 2000, there were 203 people, 72 households, and 55 families living in the city. The racial makeup of the city was 90.64% White, 0.99% Asian, 6.90% from other races, and 1.48% from two or more races. Hispanic or Latino of any race were 21.18% of the population.

There were 72 households, out of which 33.3% had children under the age of 18 living with them, 69.4% were married couples living together, 4.2% had a female householder with no husband present, and 23.6% were non-families. 16.7% of all households were made up of individuals, and 12.5% had someone living alone who was 65 years of age or older. The average household size was 2.82 and the average family size was 3.22.

In the city, the population was spread out, with 26.6% under the age of 18, 8.9% from 18 to 24, 25.6% from 25 to 44, 26.1% from 45 to 64, and 12.8% who were 65 years of age or older. The median age was 36 years. For every 100 females, there were 97.1 males. For every 100 females age 18 and over, there were 98.7 males.

As of 2000 the median income for a household in the city was $48,438, and the median income for a family was $56,250. Males had a median income of $31,071 versus $17,292 for females. The per capita income for the city was $35,637. About 5.8% of families and 11.0% of the population were below the poverty line, including 17.8% of those under the age of eighteen and 20.7% of those 65 or over.

Economy
The Gray County Wind Farm near Ensign is the largest wind farm in Kansas.

Education
Ensign is in USD 102, Cimarron-Ensign. Ensign had its own high school until 1984. The Ensign High School mascot was Ensign Wildcats.

Notable people
 John Crutcher, former Lieutenant Governor of Kansas.

References

Further reading

External links
 City website
 Ensign - Directory of Public Officials
 USD 102, local school district
 Ensign City Map, KDOT

Cities in Kansas
Cities in Gray County, Kansas